The National Council for Science and the Environment (NCSE) is a U.S.-based nonpartisan, non-profit organization which has a mission to improve the scientific basis of environmental decision-making. NCSE was founded in 1990. In January 2021, NCSE became the Global Council for Science and the Environment (GCSE).

References

External links
 Global Council for Science and the Environment Homepage

Non-profit organizations based in the United States
Environmental organizations based in the United States